The Changqing oil field is an oil field located in Inner Mongolia. It was discovered in 1971 and developed by China National Petroleum Corporation. It began production in 1975 and produces oil and natural gas.

Changqing is the largest oil and gas field in China.

History 

In 2015, the CNPC announced the discovery of 100 million metric tons of tight oil geological reserves in the Changqing field (733 million barrels of oil). It was the largest discovery of tight oil in the history of China.

In 2020, it passed the 60 million ton mark in annual production (24.52 million tons of crude oil output). 50 cities in China rely on this oil field. By 2020, Changqing had also produced a total of 468.6 billion cubic meters of natural gas. In 2013, Changqing had passed the 50 million mark in annual production (23.58 million tons of crude oil).

Controversies 

In October 2020, 20 employees were arrested for stealing oil from the field.

In March 2021, the chief coordinator and head of production of Changqing oil field placed under investigation for receiving millions of yuan in bribe money.

References

Oil fields in China